Ain't No Mo is a play consisting of a series of sketch comedy-style vignettes written by Jordan Cooper. The premise of the play is set in an alternate present where the United States government has put forward a program to buy every Black person in America, who wishes, a one-way ticket to Africa. The vignettes portray how this program affects various characters and the people around them.  

The show is notable for Cooper being the youngest Black American to make his Broadway playwriting debut at age 27.

Productions

Pre-Broadway Productions 
The show debuted Off-Broadway on March 27, 2019 at the Public Theatre.

There were also productions in Washington D.C. at Woolly Mammoth Theatre Company and at Baltimore Center Stage in October 2022.

Original Broadway Production 
Broadway performances began previews November 9, 2022 ahead of a December 1 opening, at the Belasco Theatre starring Cooper, Marchánt Davis, Fedna Jacquet, Crystal Lucas-Perry, Ebony Marshall-Oliver and Shannon Matesky. The production was directed by Stevie Walker-Webb and featured sets by Scott Pask, lighting by Adam Honoré, costumes by Emilio Sosa, sound by Jonathan Deans and Taylor J. Williams, and hair/makeup/wigs by Mia M. Neal and Kirk Cambridge Del-Pesche. 

The Broadway production announced on December 9 that it would close on December 18, but on December 15 it announced an extension through December 23, running a total of 28 performances.

Notable casts

References

External links

Broadway plays
Off-Broadway plays